Xanthoparmelia angustiphylla is a foliose lichen that belongs to the genus Xanthoparmelia.

Description
Xanthoparmelia angustiphylla grows to around 5–10 cm in diameter with regular to irregular rosettes that become more irregular over time. The upper surface is yellow-green and the lower surface is black with simple rhizines that are approximately 0.2–0.8 mm long.

Habitat and range
Xanthoparmelia angustiphylla is found mostly in North America, with limited observations in Australia and Europe.

Chemistry
Xanthoparmelia angustiphylla is known to contain menegazziaic acid and usnic acid.

See also
 List of Xanthoparmelia species

References

angustiphylla
Lichen species
Lichens of Australia
Lichens of North America
Lichens of Europe
Lichens described in 1931
Taxa named by Vilmos Kőfaragó-Gyelnik